Kishanganj is a city and district headquarters of Kishanganj district in Purnia division of Bihar state.

History
Kishanganj, which was previously part of Purnia district, is part of the Mithila region.

Mithila first gained prominence after being settled by Indo-Aryan peoples who established the Mithila Kingdom (also called Kingdom of the Videhas).
During the late Vedic period (c. 1100–500 BCE), the kingdom of the Videhas became one of the major political and cultural centres of South Asia, along with Kuru and Pañcāla. The rulers of Videhas were called Janakas.

The Mithila Kingdom was later incorporated into the Vajjika League, which had its capital in the city of Vaishali, which is also in Mithila.

Demographics
As of the 2011 Census of India, Kishanganj has a population of 105,782 of which male and female are 55,143 and 50,639 respectively. Literacy rate of Kishanganj city is 73.46% higher than the state average of 61.80%. In Kishanganj, Male literacy is around 78.37% while the female literacy rate is 68.08%. In Kishanganj, Total children (0-6) in Kishanganj city are 16,884 as per figure from Census India report on 2011. There were 8,636 boys while 8,248 are girls. The children form 15.96% of the total population of Kishanganj City. It is one of the few districts where the population of Muslims are in majority.

Despite being a Muslim majority district Kishanganj town is dominated by Hindus, Hindus constitute 55.48% of the total population in the town, while there is also a significant Muslim minority constituting 42.62% of the total population.

Agriculture 
Agricultural produce from the district includes rice, wheat, arhar, masoor and jute. It is only one of the districts in Bihar to produce tea.

Climate

See also 

 List of cities in Bihar

References

 
Cities and towns in Kishanganj district